Mythology of the Caucasus is the mythologies and folklore of the various peoples of the Caucasus region.

Examples include:

North Caucasus:
Nart saga
Ossetian mythology
Vainakh mythology, covers Chechen and Ingush mythology

Southern Caucasus/Transcaucasia:
Georgian mythology
Armenian mythology
Azerbaijani mythology

cauc
Culture of the Caucasus